Torbay Heights is a suburb of the North Shore, located in Auckland, New Zealand. It is currently under local governance of Auckland Council and is situated next to Torbay.

Demographics

Torbay Heights had a population of 7,707 at the 2018 New Zealand census, an increase of 414 people (5.7%) since the 2013 census, and an increase of 540 people (7.5%) since the 2006 census. There were 2,520 households, comprising 3,825 males and 3,882 females, giving a sex ratio of 0.99 males per female, with 1,521 people (19.7%) aged under 15 years, 1,614 (20.9%) aged 15 to 29, 3,702 (48.0%) aged 30 to 64, and 864 (11.2%) aged 65 or older.

Ethnicities were 79.7% European/Pākehā, 6.2% Māori, 2.2% Pacific peoples, 16.7% Asian, and 3.0% other ethnicities. People may identify with more than one ethnicity.

The percentage of people born overseas was 49.1, compared with 27.1% nationally.

Although some people chose not to answer the census's question about religious affiliation, 53.7% had no religion, 36.3% were Christian, 0.2% had Māori religious beliefs, 0.7% were Hindu, 1.1% were Muslim, 0.9% were Buddhist and 1.7% had other religions.

Of those at least 15 years old, 1,836 (29.7%) people had a bachelor's or higher degree, and 522 (8.4%) people had no formal qualifications. 1,542 people (24.9%) earned over $70,000 compared to 17.2% nationally. The employment status of those at least 15 was that 3,441 (55.6%) people were employed full-time, 936 (15.1%) were part-time, and 198 (3.2%) were unemployed.

Education
Glamorgan School is a coeducational contributing primary (years 1-6) school with a roll of  students as of  Glamorgan Kindergarten (preschool) is down the road near Glamorgan School, and has 61 students as of March 2020.

References

External links
 Glamorgan School website

Suburbs of Auckland
North Shore, New Zealand